Captain The Honourable Sir Archibald Douglas Cochrane,  (8 January 1885 – 16 April 1958) was a Scottish politician, naval officer, and colonial governor.

Early life
The second son of Thomas Cochrane, 1st Baron Cochrane of Cults, he was born in Springfield, Fife in 1885. He ranked eighteenth among 62 successful candidates in examinations for entry to the Royal Navy training ship HMS Britannia intake term of September 1899, with 2374 marks, and joined as a naval cadet on the battleship HMS Mars in January 1901. In June 1902 he was posted as midshipman to the battleship HMS London, which was flagship for the Coronation Review for King Edward VII in August 1902 before she was posted to the Mediterranean Station later the same year. During the First World War he was mentioned in dispatches three times, and awarded the Distinguished Service Order and Bar.

Political career
He was Unionist Member of Parliament (MP) for East Fife from 1924 until he lost the seat at the 1929 General Election. He then sat for Dunbartonshire from a 1932 by-election until 1936.

He was Governor of Burma from 1936 until 1941. He was also a director of Standard Life.

Personal life
In 1926 he married Julia Dorothy, daughter of Fiennes Cornwallis, 1st Baron Cornwallis. The couple had one son Douglas, and one daughter Mabel.

He was appointed a Knight Commander of the Order of the Star of India in 1936 and Knight Grand Cross of the Order of St Michael and St George in 1937.

References

External links
 World Statesmen.org
 

1885 births
1958 deaths
Unionist Party (Scotland) MPs
Members of the Parliament of the United Kingdom for Scottish constituencies
Knights Commander of the Order of the Star of India
Knights Grand Cross of the Order of St Michael and St George
UK MPs 1924–1929
UK MPs 1931–1935
UK MPs 1935–1945
Administrators in British Burma
Younger sons of barons
Royal Navy officers of World War I
Companions of the Distinguished Service Order
Members of the Parliament of the United Kingdom for Fife constituencies
20th-century Scottish politicians
Burma in World War II
Archibald